Souk El Grana is one of the souks of Tunis. Its name comes from the Granas (Jews from Livorno) who came to Tunisia in the 17th century.

Location 
This souk is located in the north of the medina of Tunis, in the Bab Souika neighborhood and near the Al-Zaytuna Mosque.

History 
Although this souk existed before the arrival of the Jews from Livorno, it became bigger and better with them. During the 17th century, the Jews transformed this souk into an economic center in Tunis. Agricultural products, crafts, caravans, chachias, ivory, and many other products were sold in this market.

Architecture 
The souk is covered by a barrel vault made from bricks. There is also a synagogue made from dimension stone that were taken from the ruins of Roman buildings in Tunis.

References 

Italian-Jewish culture in Tunisia
Jews and Judaism in Tunis
Grana